Grímsbær is a small shopping centre in the middle of Reykjavík, Iceland. 

Originally a two-story structure built into a hillside, in 2004 a third floor was built on top of the existing structure and the centre grew to around 2000 m2, which it remains to this day.

References

External links 
 

Shopping malls in Reykjavík